"Lonely Together" is a 1981 song recorded by Barry Manilow. It was written by Kenny Nolan. The song was the second single release from Manilow's 1980 album, Barry.

Record World said that the song's "striking string/choral arrangement is primed for pop-A/C acceptance."

Chart history
"Lonely Together" peaked at number 45 on the US Billboard Hot 100. It reached number seven on the U.S. adult contemporary chart. In Ireland and the UK, it reached numbers 20 and 21, respectively.

References

External links
 

Songs about loneliness
1980 songs
1981 singles
Barry Manilow songs
Songs written by Kenny Nolan
Arista Records singles